Rudi Felgenheier (born 20 November 1930; died 20 October 2005) is a former Grand Prix motorcycle road racer from Germany. His best year was in 1952 when he won the 250cc German Grand Prix and finished the season in fifth place in the 250cc world championship. Felgenheimer was seriously injured during practice for the 1953 Isle of Man TT.

References 

1930 births
2005 deaths
German motorcycle racers
250cc World Championship riders
Isle of Man TT riders